Havant railway station is a railway station in Havant, Hampshire, near Portsmouth, located on the Portsmouth Direct Line which runs between London Waterloo and Portsmouth Harbour. 

Havant is served by trains operated by Southern, who provide the most trains at the station, and South Western Railway who also provide frequent trains and manage the station.

Havant is the nearest station to Hayling Island and also serves the nearby town of Waterlooville. Buses depart from the nearby bus station to both these places.

History
The first station at Havant was built in 1847 by the London, Brighton & South Coast Railway (LB&SCR) 500 metres to the east - a small wayside station (called Havant Halt). It was demolished after a serious fire. A newer station was then built 200 m west to serve the then new London & South Western Railway (L&SWR) Portsmouth Direct Line. This station was demolished so that a bigger station could be built 300 m further west to serve the new Hayling Island branch line. It had three platforms, one for Hayling Island and two for the stopping main line services.

Prior to grouping, the "Battle of Havant" took place between the LB&SCR and the L&SWR when the two railway companies fought for the right to use LB&SCR tracks into Havant in order for the L&SWR to reach Portsmouth (see ).

Havant was the terminus for the Hayling Island branch services until late in 1963. Apart from the platform there was a run round loop, a siding serving a warehouse and a water column supplied by a circular metal water tank located near the signal box. In the Spring of 1966 the Hayling Island tracks were removed. The space they occupied was later replaced with a car park and a fence on the south side of the platform.

As part of the Waterloo to Portsmouth electrification the station was completely rebuilt in 1938. The number of tracks was increased from two to four, two for stopping trains and the two for non-stop, generally express trains. The northernmost of the two fast tracks (as mentioned above) was later removed, and the remaining fast (through) track was also removed in late 2006. Judging by the new track layout east of the station, this arrangement seems to be permanent.

After the engineering work of 2007 was finally completed after a lengthy delay that had lasted from the beginning of the year, the stations two platforms have become bi-directional platforms. This means that both platforms can be used for trains going in either direction. Such as when the fast Waterloo service, the xx34 is running late behind the slow Waterloo service xx40. This means that the Slower service may be placed on Platform 1, which services to London go on, and wait, while the faster service is brought onto Platform 2, and then over take the service, so that it can make up the time lost, and not lose more time while waiting to overtake the slower service up in Haslemere station.

Recent changes

Since July 2006, the Hayling Island platform face no longer exists and a new cycle centre has been built in place of the former platform. A new station name pole has been erected at the position also. As well as these, most of the signs within the station were changed and new seats have been installed on the platforms. This was in line with commitments made in the South Western franchise.

There has been some discussion about putting a third (terminating) platform in the gap, however this would have to be very short and narrow. There has also been discussion about reinstating the Hayling Island platform, and even the whole Hayling Island branch. Both of these proposals have now been completely abandoned.

In December 2006, the fast southbound through track was removed. Both the entry and exit from the southbound platform were straightened out to allow a quicker entry and exit speed. New crossovers were put in place to allow bi-directional working on both platforms. From west to east the new layout will be: new NB->SB crossover, new SB->NB crossover, existing road bridge, platforms, new NB->SB crossover, existing SB->NB crossover, level crossing. The level crossing was also resurfaced and new crossing gates installed

Services
Havant is a junction station and provides passengers with an interchange between the West Coastway Line and the Portsmouth Direct Line. It therefore has services to Portsmouth,  via Gatwick Airport, Brighton and Southampton.

Most trains at Havant are provided by Southern, who operate five trains per hour in each direction to and from London Victoria, Brighton, Littlehampton, Portsmouth and Southampton. South Western Railway serve the station with three trains per hour in each direction between London Waterloo and Portsmouth.

The typical off-peak service in trains per hour is:

 3 tph to  via  (2 semi-fast, 1 stopping)
 2 tph to  via 
 2 tph to  via 
 1 tph to 
 2 tph to 

Services at Havant are operated using a mixture of rolling stock including Class 313, 377, 444 and 450s.

Former services 
Until May 2022, Great Western Railway operated limited services between Brighton, Portsmouth Harbour and Bristol Temple Meads that called at Havant.

Further reading

References

External links

Former London, Brighton and South Coast Railway stations
Havant
Railway stations in Great Britain opened in 1847
Railway stations in Hampshire
DfT Category C2 stations
Railway stations served by Govia Thameslink Railway
Railway stations served by South Western Railway
1847 establishments in England